Anna Maria Cecchi (24 April 1943 – 22 May 2021) was an Italian swimmer. She competed at the 1960 Summer Olympics and the 1964 Summer Olympics.

References

External links
 

1943 births
2021 deaths
Italian female swimmers
Olympic swimmers of Italy
Swimmers at the 1960 Summer Olympics
Swimmers at the 1964 Summer Olympics
Sportspeople from Trieste